Doggart is a surname. Notable people include:

Caroline Doggart (born 1939), development economist and author
Graham Doggart (1897-1963), English administrator, cricketer, footballer and magistrate
Hubert Doggart (1925-2018), English sports administrator, cricketer and schoolmaster
James Hamilton Doggart (1900-1989), ophthalmologist
Nike Doggart, conservationist, environmental activist, and writer
Peter Doggart (1927-1965), English cricketer
Sebastian Doggart, English/American television producer